North Carolina Highway 280 (NC 280) is a primary state highway in the U.S. state of North Carolina that runs from the city of Brevard in Transylvania County to the town of Fletcher in Henderson County.

Route description

NC 280 begins at the junction of US 64 and US 276 near the city of Brevard. It then travels northeasterly through the unincorporated community of Pisgah Forest as a four-lane highway before crossing Little Mountain and entering the Boyd Township community, where it widens to four-lanes with a center turning lane. It runs for a total of  through Transylvania County as Asheville Highway before entering Henderson County at which point it becomes Boylston Highway. It continues as a four-lane highway with a center turning lane for  through rural northwestern Henderson County before intersecting NC 191 (Haywood Road) in the town of Mills River.

After crossing the French Broad River, the highway becomes New Airport Road at the intersection of Fanning Bridge Road in Fletcher, where it resumes the configuration of four-lanes with a center turning lane. Between the French Broad River crossing and an interchange with I-26 and US 74 (exit 40), NC 280 often crosses between Fletcher, Henderson County and the southern reaches of Asheville, Buncombe County. From the I-26 interchange, the road continues for another , terminating at the intersection of US 25 (Hendersonville Road) and US 25A (Sweeten Creek Road) in Arden.

Although the highway runs primarily through rural farming and residential areas for most of its length, the stretch between Fanning Bridge Road and US 25 currently represents the most developed section of the highway. A growing number of national retailers, restaurants, and hotels can be found within a half-mile of the I-26/US 74 interchange. Landmarks along this section of highway include Asheville Regional Airport and the WNC Agricultural Center, site of the annual North Carolina Mountain State Fair. For  of its path through Transylvania and Henderson counties, the highway runs adjacent to the eastern boundary of Pisgah National Forest.

History

Rerouted from its original path to become a connecting route from I-26 at the Asheville Regional Airport to the city of Brevard, its expanded and current form was originally known as the Brevard/I-26 Connector.
Until 1991, NC 280 ran concurrent with NC 191 from Mills River in Henderson County to the community of Avery Creek in Buncombe County, at which point NC 280 turned onto Long Shoals Road (currently signed NC 146).

Major intersections

References

External links

NCRoads.com: N.C. 280

280
Transportation in Transylvania County, North Carolina
Transportation in Henderson County, North Carolina
Transportation in Buncombe County, North Carolina
1931 establishments in North Carolina